Angela Williams is the name of

 Angela Williams (sprinter, born 1965), American sprinter of Trinidad and Tobago descent
 Angela Williams (sprinter, born 1980), American sprinter
 Angela Williams (politician), Member of the Colorado House of Representatives